Annabel Croft defeated Elna Reinach in the final, 3–6, 6–3, 6–2 to win the girls' singles tennis title at the 1984 Wimbledon Championships.

Seeds

  Melissa Brown (third round)
  Michelle Torres (third round)
  Annabel Croft (champion)
  Rene Mentz (quarterfinals)
  Larisa Savchenko (second round)
  Niege Dias (quarterfinals)
  Mercedes Paz (third round)
  Silvana Campos (second round)

Draw

Finals

Top half

Section 1

Section 2

Bottom half

Section 3

Section 4

References

External links

Girls' Singles
Wimbledon Championship by year – Girls' singles